Only the Lonely is an EP released by Unkle on 4 April 2011. Its entire track list also appears on Unkle's Where Did the Night Fall – Another Night Out.

Track list

 "Money and Run" (feat. Nick Cave)
 "The Dog Is Black" (feat. Leila Moss)
 "Only The Lonely" (dub)
 "Wash The Love Away" (feat. Gavin Clark)
 "Sunday Song" (feat. Rachel Fannan)
 "Forever" (feat. Ian Astbury) * Australian Only Bonus Track

References

Unkle albums
2010 EPs